The 2004 Men's Hockey Champions Trophy was the 26th edition of the Hockey Champions Trophy men's field hockey tournament. It was held in Lahore, Pakistan from December 4–12, 2004.



Squads

Head Coach: Bernhard Peters

Head Coach: Gerhard Rach

Head Coach: Terry Walsh

Head Coach: Kevin Towns

Head Coach: Roelant Oltmans

Head Coach: Maurits Hendriks

Umpires
Below is the eight umpires appointed by International Hockey Federation (FIH):

Rashad Butt (PAK)
Ged Curran (SCO)
Muhammad Faiz (PAK)
Hamish Jamson (ENG)
Tim Pullman (AUS)
Daniel Santi (ARG)
Virendra Singh (IND)
Rob ten Cate (NED)

Results
All times are Pakistan Standard Time (UTC+05:00)

Pool

Classification

Fifth and sixth place

Third and fourth place

Final

Awards

Final standings

External links
Official FIH website

C
C
2004
Champions Trophy (field hockey)